Ben Aldridge may refer to:

 Ben Aldridge (actor) (born 1985), British actor
 Ben Aldridge (defensive back) (1926–1986), American football player